Rock Hill is an unincorporated community and census-designated place (CDP) in Grant Parish, Louisiana, United States. As of the 2010 census it had a population of 274.

Rock Hill is located in southwestern Grant Parish along U.S. Route 71, which leads northwest  to Colfax, the parish seat, and southeast  to Alexandria.

Demographics

References

Census-designated places in Louisiana
Census-designated places in Grant Parish, Louisiana